The 1986 All-Ireland Senior Camogie Championship was the high point of the 1986 season. The championship was won by Killkenny who defeated Dublin by a nine-point margin in the final. The match drew an attendance of 5,000.

Arrangements
Galway fielded ten of their 1985 junior winning side in the  1986 Senior championship but were defeated by a last minute goal scored by Wexford’s Jackie Codd at Monamolin. Deirdre Costello scored 3-1 for Galway. Angela Downey scored 4-2 in Kilkenny’s big quarter-final win over Limerick.

Semi-finals
A four-goal blitz by Dublin’s Marie Connell turned the semi-final at Monamolin in Dublin’s favour. The second semi-final at Nowlan Park was one of the best in the history of camogie’s 12-a-side era. Cork were leading by five points 3-12 to 2-10 entering injury time when, out of nowhere, Angela Downey got inside her marker and blasted the ball past Marion McCarthy from close range. A short puck-out fell to Angela. Not content to go for a point she let fly for a goal. Marion McCarthy dived to bring off a great save but saw the ball go off her stick to the unmarked Jo Dunne who scored another Kilkenny goal. Cork had led by three points at half-time and a goal from Irene O'Leary seemed to wrap it up for Cork with time running out. The Irish Independent reported: The match was the best seen for some time. It had everything, two skilful committed teams, great scores, near misses and a breathtaking finish. From camogie’s point of view, what a pity it did not end in a draw, thus giving fans another chance to watch these great sides in action. Full credit to Kilkenny for plugging away when the game appeared to be slipping away from them. Claire Jones had her best game in the Kilkenny colours. She along with Angela Downey, Breda Holmes, Jo Dunne and Mary Fitzpatrick looked very sharp.

Final
Kilkenny led 0-5 to 0-2 at half time and as Pat Roche wrote in the Irish Times, the “rate of their subsequent work was devastating,” as they built from a four-point lead to an 11-point one:
 There have been few hurling matches that have been played at headquarters or any other venue this seas that could compare with the individual skills of the combatants. Ann Downey plays with the number seven on her back, which gives her the freedom of the pitch. She spent most of the afternoon breaking up Dublin attacks and sending her side forward with seariung drives into a front running division that included her sister Angela, whose lighting sorties and skills are designed to frighten any defence.

Final stages

 
MATCH RULES
50 minutes
Replay if scores level
Maximum of 3 substitutions

See also
 All-Ireland Senior Hurling Championship
 Wikipedia List of Camogie players
 National Camogie League
 Camogie All Stars Awards
 Ashbourne Cup

References

External links
 Camogie Association
 All-Ireland Senior Camogie Championship: Roll of Honour
 Historical reports of All Ireland finals
 Camogie on facebook
 Camogie on GAA Oral History Project

1986 in camogie
1986